La Peca is a place in La Peca District in the Bagua Province, Amazonas Region, Peru. The town's population is approximately 22,400.

See also 
 Llaqtan

References

Populated places in the Amazonas Region